Stenoonops is a genus of spiders in the family Oonopidae. It was first described in 1892 by Simon. , it contains 28 species.

Species
Stenoonops comprises the following species:
Stenoonops alazan Platnick & Dupérré, 2010
Stenoonops belmopan Platnick & Dupérré, 2010
Stenoonops bimini Platnick & Dupérré, 2010
Stenoonops brendae Platnick, Dupérré & Berniker, 2013
Stenoonops cabo Platnick & Dupérré, 2010
Stenoonops canita Platnick & Dupérré, 2010
Stenoonops dimotus Chickering, 1969
Stenoonops egenulus Simon, 1893
Stenoonops exgord Platnick & Dupérré, 2010
Stenoonops insolitus Chickering, 1969
Stenoonops jara Platnick & Dupérré, 2010
Stenoonops kochalkai Platnick & Dupérré, 2010
Stenoonops luquillo Platnick & Dupérré, 2010
Stenoonops macabus Chickering, 1969
Stenoonops mandeville Platnick & Dupérré, 2010
Stenoonops murphyorum Platnick & Dupérré, 2010
Stenoonops opisthornatus Benoit, 1979
Stenoonops peckorum Platnick & Dupérré, 2010
Stenoonops petrunkevitchi Chickering, 1951
Stenoonops pretiosus (Bryant, 1942)
Stenoonops saba Platnick & Dupérré, 2010
Stenoonops saintjohn Platnick & Dupérré, 2010
Stenoonops scabriculus Simon, 1892
Stenoonops schuhi Platnick, Dupérré & Berniker, 2013
Stenoonops simla Platnick & Dupérré, 2010
Stenoonops tayrona Platnick & Dupérré, 2010
Stenoonops tobyi Platnick, Dupérré & Berniker, 2013
Stenoonops tortola Platnick & Dupérré, 2010

References

Oonopidae
Araneomorphae genera
Fauna of the Caribbean
Spiders of North America
Spiders of South America